Perranwell station is on the Maritime Line between Truro and Falmouth Docks in south-west England. The station is managed by, and the services are operated by, Great Western Railway.

History

The station was opened as Perran on 24 August 1863 when the Cornwall Railway opened the line from Truro to Falmouth, it was renamed Perranwell on 19 February 1864 to avoid confusion with nearby .  

It originally had 2 platforms either side of a passing loop, a goods shed with several sidings to south, one of which was equipped with a 2-ton crane, the yard was able to accommodate live stock and most types of goods. The signal box here was very distinctive, being sited on girders above the track alongside the goods shed.

The station was host to a GWR camp coach from 1936 to 1939. A camping coach was also positioned here by the Western Region from 1952 to 1964.

The Cornwall Railway was amalgamated into the Great Western Railway on 1 July 1889. The Great Western Railway was nationalised into British Railways from 1 January 1948 but was then privatised in the 1990s.

The goods shed still stands in the forecourt despite goods traffic ceasing on 4 January 1965. A dry drinking fountain can be seen on the platform, a reminder of more important days. 

A short distance on either side of the station, valleys had to be crossed on lofty timber viaducts. To the north, Carnon viaduct crossed 96 feet above the Carnon River valley and the Redruth and Chasewater Railway. In the other direction, trains crossed the smaller Perran Viaduct (56 feet high, 339 feet long).

In the 1980s the station had become run down with only a small aluminium shelter with polycarbonate panels offering protection for passengers.  However, during the late 1990s a new brick waiting shelter was built as part of a refurbishment programme at all the "Maritime Line" stations.

Facilities
There is just one platform with level access from the car park. There are information boards on the platform, as well as a waiting shelter. There are no ticket buying facilities, so passengers have to buy a ticket in advance or from the guard on the train.

Services
The new loop at Penryn allowed services on the Maritime Line to be doubled in frequency from 17 May 2009 to give up to a half-hourly service, however when two trains are operating only alternate services call at Perranwell.

Community Rail 
The railway from Truro to Falmouth is designated as a community rail line and is supported by marketing provided by the Devon and Cornwall Rail Partnership. The line is promoted under the "Maritime Line" name.

References

Further reading
The Great Western Railway in Mid Cornwall, Alan Bennett, Kingfisher Railway Publications, Southampton 1988.

External links

Railway stations in Cornwall
Former Great Western Railway stations
Railway stations in Great Britain opened in 1863
Railway stations served by Great Western Railway
DfT Category F2 stations